United Nations Security Council Resolution 128 was adopted on June 11, 1958. Having heard charges from the representative of Lebanon concerning interference by the United Arab Republic in the internal affairs of Lebanon, the Council decided to dispatch an observation group, designated the United Nations Observation Group in Lebanon, to ensure that no illegal infiltration of personnel, supply of arms or other materiel across the Lebanese borders was taking place.  The Council authorized the Secretary-General to take the necessary steps to that end and requested the observation group keep them informed through the Secretary-General.

Resolution 128 was adopted by ten votes to none, with an abstention from the Soviet Union.

See also
List of United Nations Security Council Resolutions 101 to 200 (1953–1965)

References
Text of the Resolution at undocs.org

External links
 

 0128
 0128
 0128
 0128
United Arab Republic
1958 in Egypt
1958 in Lebanon
1958 in Syria
June 1958 events